Amendment 38 was  a measure on the 2006 ballot in Colorado. If passed, it would have amended the Colorado Constitution. It would have extend the petition process to all levels of state government to expand citizens' ability to propose changes to state laws and local ordinances or resolutions.

Amendment 38 would have made the process of getting an initiative on to a state or local ballot significantly easier. It would have expanded the ability of citizens to propose new laws, and limits government’s ability to change or repeal measures that voters have decided.

Ballot measure proponents would have been able to write their own descriptions of the measure for the state’s Blue Book of ballot measure information. Currently the nonpartisan Legislative Council staff writes these descriptions.

Under Amendment 38, any elected official or government employee who makes a public statement regarding any ballot measure would be subject to fines of $3,000 or more.

Contents 
The amendment appeared on the ballot as follows:

Results
Amendment 38 failed to pass 69.21% to 30.79%.

See also
 List of Colorado ballot measures

References

External links
 Legislative Council ballot analysis
 Ballot question language
 Petition Rights Amendment political action committee supporting the amendment
 No on 38 Don't Let Them Hurt Colorado political action committee opposing the amendment
 Bell Policy Center 2006 Voter's Guide analysis
 Denver Post Election Results

2006 Colorado ballot measures
Initiatives in the United States
Constitution of Colorado
Electoral system ballot measures in the United States